John Kosty is an American men's volleyball coach and former player. He's currently the head coach of the Stanford Cardinal men's volleyball team. He was named the 2010 AVCA Coach of the Year for leading Stanford to the 2010 NCAA men's volleyball tournament championship.

Early life and education
Kosty, a Fountain Valley, California, native, attended Fountain Valley High School and played men's volleyball. He attended Golden West College for one year before enrolling at the University of California, Santa Barbara. While at UCSB, Kosty was a middle blocker for the UC Santa Barbara Gauchos men's volleyball team from 1985 to 1987 alongside teammate Jared Huffman. In just three seasons, Kosty found himself near the top of the Gaucho record books placing third in career solo blocks and third in single season solo blocks (1987). Kosty was named as an All-American in 1987.

Coaching career
Kosty joined Stanford Cardinal as an assistant coach in 1991. He served in that position under Ruben Nieves, then later Don Shaw.

With Kosty as head coach, the Stanford Cardinal won the 2010 NCAA men's volleyball tournament, the program's first since 1997 when he was an assistant coach.

Kosty was named the 2010 AVCA Coach of the Year in addition to being the 2010 and 2014 Mountain Pacific Sports Federation Coach of the Year.

Honors
As head coach
NCAA men's volleyball tournament: 2010
AVCA Coach of the Year: 2010
MPSF Coach of the Year: 2010, 2014

As assistant coach
NCAA men's volleyball tournament: 1997

References

External links
 John Kosty at Stanford Cardinal

Living people
American men's volleyball players
American volleyball coaches
Middle blockers
Stanford Cardinal men's volleyball coaches
UC Santa Barbara Gauchos men's volleyball players
Year of birth missing (living people)